Bhagwanpur is a Town, Tehsil, and Taluka in Haridwar district in the state of Uttarakhand, India. It is 57 km far from Dehradun which is the capital of Uttarakhand. It is the commercial centre of Ghad Chhetra. It was founded by Bhagwana in the old age Zamindara. It is one of Uttarakhand's industrial zones.

Demographics
As of 2011 India census, Bhagwanpur had a population of 274586. Males constitute 52% of the population and females 48%.Bhagwanpur has an average literacy rate of 67.76%, higher than the national average of 59.5%; with male literacy of 76.82% and female literacy of 58.05%.

Government
The current MLA of Bhagwanpur is Mamta Rakesh wife of previous MLA Late Surender Rakesh of Congress Party.

Road links
Roorkee- 13 km
Saharanpur-27 km
Chhutmalpur-11 km
Haridwar-35 km near
Dehradun-63 km near
Muzaffarnagar-60 km near

Educational institute
Bhagwanpur hosts Quantum Global university, MotherHood university, RCP Universe, Swan Public School and Arogyam Mecal college and hospital. A Govt Medical college has been proposed by Govt of Uttarakhand.

Railway link
Bhagwanpur is not connected to the railway network. The nearest railway stations are:
Iqbalpur Railway Station-11 km
Chauriyala Railway Station-9 km
Roorkee Railway Station-12 km

References

Cities and towns in Haridwar district